In mathematics, particularly commutative algebra, an invertible module is intuitively a module that has an inverse with respect to the tensor product. Invertible modules form the foundation for the definition of invertible sheaves in algebraic geometry.

Formally, a finitely generated module M over a ring R is said to be invertible if it is locally a free module of rank 1. In other words,  for all primes P of R. Now, if M is an invertible R-module, then its dual  is its inverse with respect to the tensor product, i.e. .

The theory of invertible modules is closely related to the theory of codimension one varieties including the theory of divisors.

See also
 Picard group

References
 Eisenbud, David, Commutative Algebra with a View Toward Algebraic Geometry, Springer, 

Mathematical structures
Algebra